The 2020–21 Logan Cup was the 27th edition of the Logan Cup, a first-class cricket competition in Zimbabwe, which started on 9 December 2020. After originally scheduled to start on 3 December 2020, the tournament was moved back a week to allow time to setup a bio-secure bubble. Five teams took part in the competition, including the Southern Rocks, who last played in the 2013–14 tournament. There was no defending champion, after the previous tournament was voided due to the COVID-19 pandemic.

Four matches were played during December 2020. However, on 3 January 2021, Zimbabwe Cricket halted all cricket in the country following a rise in COVID-19 cases. In mid-March 2021, it was reported that the tournament would resume later that month, with the next round of matches starting on 18 March 2021.

In March 2021, Rocks won their first ever Logan Cup title, with a match left to play.

Point table

 Champions

Squads
The following squads were named for the tournament:

Fixtures

References

External links
 Series home at ESPN Cricinfo

Logan Cup
Logan Cup
Logan Cup
Logan Cup
Logan Cup, 2020-21